__notoc__

Eva Mattes (born 14 December 1954) is an Austrian-German actress. She has appeared in four films directed by director Rainer Werner Fassbinder (The Bitter Tears of Petra von Kant, Effi Briest and In a Year of 13 Moons). In  (1984), she played a bearded film director, based on the recently deceased Fassbinder.

She has also appeared in two films of Werner Herzog, with whom she was in a relationship. Mattes also appeared in Germany, Pale Mother, and in Enemy at the Gates as the mother of Sasha Filippov. On television, she has played Klara Blum in the police procedural series Tatort.

Mattes lives in Berlin with Austrian artist Wolfgang Georgsdorf and two children.

Awards
 1981 Bavarian Film Awards, Best Actress
 1979 Cannes Film Festival, Jury's Special Grand Prix

Selected filmography

References

External links

Homepage of Eva Mattes

Photographs of Eva Mattes

1954 births
20th-century German actresses
21st-century German actresses
German film actresses
German television actresses
Living people
Best Actress German Film Award winners
Cannes Film Festival Award for Best Actress winners
Recipients of the Cross of the Order of Merit of the Federal Republic of Germany
People from Miesbach (district)
Südwestrundfunk people